{{Infobox handball club|
 clubname =  МРК Куманово  MRK Kumanovo |
 capacity = 6,500 |
 chairman =Marjan Milkovski |
 manager = Igor Kotevski |
 league = Macedonian First League of Handball |
 position = ''' |
 season = 2022-23 |
| pattern_la1           = 
| pattern_b1            = _whiteleftsideshoulder
| pattern_ra1           = 
| leftarm1              = EE1212
| body1                 = EE1212
| rightarm1             = FFFFFF
| shorts1               = EE1212
  pattern_la2=|pattern_b2=|pattern_ra2=|
  leftarm2=FFFFFF|body2=FFFFFF|rightarm2=FFFFFF|shorts2= EE1212|colour2=red|colour1=white|ground=Sports Hall Kumanovo}}MRK Kumanovo(Men's Handball Club Kumanovo)() is a team handball club from Kumanovo, North Macedonia. They compete in the Macedonian First League of Handball, they are the winners of the first ever Macedonian Handball Cup in 1993 and have played in the qualifications for the EHF Cup.

Kumanovo ArenaSports Hall Kumanovo is an indoor sport venue located in Kumanovo. The hall has capacity of 6,500 seats and was built in 1980.

It is the biggest indoor sport hall in Kumanovo, where competitions of basketball, indoor soccer, handball, volleyball and boxing matches are held.

Honours
The team won the first ever Macedonian Handball Cup in 1993.

Accomplishments
Domestic competitions 
 Handball Cup of North Macedonia  1993
European competitions EHF Cup Winners' Cup 1/8 Final:''' 1 1993-94

External links

Kumanovo
Sport in Kumanovo